The CPBL Rookie of the Year is awarded to the rookie who performs best in a particular Chinese Professional Baseball League season. The award has been given since 1993.

Rookies cannot have played in Nippon Professional Baseball, the International League, the Pacific Coast League, or Major League Baseball.

List of winners

See also

Chinese Professional Baseball League lists
Chinese Professional Baseball League awards
Rookie player awards
Awards established in 1993
1993 establishments in Taiwan